The Cobweb is a comic book heroine co-created by famed writer Alan Moore and veteran underground artist Melinda Gebbie.  Cobweb's only apparent powers were allure and the ability to make an entrance. The Cobweb first appeared in the premier issue of Tomorrow Stories, an anthology title in the America's Best Comics line.

Publication history
Artist Gebbie's deep background in feminist erotica showed in the depiction of the Cobweb, whose costume consisted of pulled-back 1940s-style hair, a domino mask, a diaphanous purple nighty, garters and, apparently, no panties. Her sidekick and lesbian lover, Clarice, was a leggy blonde in skimpy chauffeur's outfit, also with domino mask. Gebbie utilized a number of styles, making one story a surrealist collage in the style of André Breton or Max Ernst, another in tribute to Marjorie Henderson Buell's beloved "Little Lulu" strip. Gebbie drew most of the Cobweb stories in the twelve-issue run of Tomorrow Stories. The remainder were handled by Joyce Chin and Dame Darcy.

The Cobweb stories are, as mentioned above, mostly vehicles for Melinda Gebbie's feminist erotica writing style, as well as an opportunity for her to do stories in multiple styles, regardless of any sense of continuity, even going so far as to take place in different time periods.  Nevertheless, a recent pair of America's Best Comics specials have attempted to flesh out the origin of Cobweb and Clarice, as well as to explain their often-changing stories.

America's Best Comics (ABC) itself was an imprint of Jim Lee's Wildstorm Comics.  When Lee signed an exclusive contract with DC Comics, the entire ABC line would eventually end up being distributed by DC. This arrangement caused problems all around when Moore wrote a Cobweb story for Tomorrow Stories #8, which touched on Scientology founder L. Ron Hubbard and his connection to occultist John Whiteside Parsons.  Fearing legal action, DC ordered the story scrapped.  Moore, in response, withdrew his approval for a commemorative fifteenth anniversary hardcover of his landmark Watchmen graphic novel. The forbidden story eventually found a home in Top Shelf Asks the Big Questions, an anthology published by independent comics publisher Top Shelf Productions, with Cobweb renamed "La Toile" and wearing a dark green version of her costume. She also appears in a promotional write-up for Moore and Gebbe's Lost Girls within the same anthology, though she does not appear in Girls.

Fictional character biography
Laurel Lakeland is a millionaire's heiress, living together with her driver Clarice in Indigo City. Her motivation for fighting crime as the Cobweb is boredom and a yearning for thrills.

Family history
A series of pin-up art calendar pages in the ABC: A-Z special as well as a World's Finest Comics-homage in Tomorrow Stories Special #1 explain that Cobweb and Clarice are the latest in a long line of parthenogenetically-produced daughters, their mutual mothers and their ancestors both fulfilling the roles of the masked adventurer and her loving sidekick for centuries. Already an often taboo-breaking series, this also injects a sense of incestuousness between the two figures, who are ostensibly raised as sisters, in addition to lesbianism.

Their lineage begins in the 16th century, when all the males of an Incan village in the remote Valley of Inca-Fingas are all slain by an avalanche while on their way to battle Spanish conquistadors. In order to continue their village, the high priestess Lula Lacalan and her stuttering handmaiden Cla-Cla-Cla emulate the local Desert Grassland Whiptail Lizards, which simulate sex to trigger pregnancy, and are miraculously successful. Their daughters are later able to escape the Valley and, also capable of parthenogenesis, both continue Lula's and Cla-Cla-Cla's lineages. They and their descendants become legendary pirates, highwaymen, and other such ne'er-do-wells, both to fund and as part of their lives of debauchery.

No matter how far their escapades take them around the world, however, each generation of sisters always return to the Peruvian valley their ancestors came from, taking up a place in the so-called Graveyard of Glamour, a cavern where the chilled air of the high Andes preserves their bodies. This seems to be a rather bizarre homage to the practice of succession by Lee Falk's The Phantom and his predecessors. Since the sisters do this soon after their daughters reach adulthood, and the bodies are pictured as relatively young, presumably a ritualistic lovers' suicide pact occurs in this cavern, although this is not specifically stated.

This continues until the beginning of the 20th century when the current Cobweb's great-grandmother, La Toile the "mistress of villainy", embarks on a life of espionage after an encounter with Mata Hari.  Disillusioned with her mistress' down-spiral into drug abuse and demonism (rather than the usual amount), her partner Clothilde flees to America with their daughters, using stolen money to found the Lakeland Ornamental Gardens. As adults, La Toile's daughter Lorelei becomes the first Cobweb, with Clothilde's daughter Claudia as her sidekick, attempting to make up for their ancestors' crimes as vigilantes, battling criminals and later saboteurs from 1928 until 1945. Their daughters Laverne and Clara then take over in 1953, operating in Indigo as well as fighting evil worldwide as part of Tom Strong's science hero team, America's Best.  They retire in 1971 to raise Laurel and Clarice, and soon after return to the lost valley in Peru to join their ancestors when their daughters come of age.

Laurel Lakeland
The current Cobweb apparently started her crimefighting careers at a very early age, although as Li'l Cobweb she was less than successful, and not taken seriously by adults.

The tale in Tomorrow Stories Special #1 reveals that, despite their close relationship, Cobweb and Clarice's relationship has only recently blossomed. The story explains that their first kiss occurred on June 14 of the previous year, having revealed their true feelings while caught in an apparently inescapable trap, which they are able to escape from when the villain deactivates it to watch them make out. Prior to this, Clarice had apparently only loved Cobweb from afar, despite her constant fawning, and Cobweb had often formed a latently sexual relationship with many of her foes, if not outright become a lover at some point. During this time, she also formed an at first antagonistic relationship with another Tomorrow Stories feature character, Greyshirt, the two of them eventually recognizing the other as their equal. This may have ended completely, or remains an on-again/off-again romance that Clarice remains silently jealous of, although no story has been definitive on this point.

As stated, the current mythos of this character place Cobweb and her partner as eventually having children together parthenogenetically, passing along their identities to their children when they reach adulthood, and then joining their ancestors in Peru. This is a tradition that the current Cobweb and Clarice both accept, although no story yet has shown them in a rush to fulfill these obligations.

As Laurel, Cobweb lives in the stately Lakeland Pagoda, the former site of the Ornamental Gardens, underneath which is located the Vaults of Voluptuousnes, a secret headquarters which parodies both Superman's Fortress of Solitude and the Batcave. Revealed in the aforementioned Tomorrow Stories Special, the Pagoda connects to the Vaults via hidden "Passion-Poles", a clear parody of the bat-poles, which automatically change Laurel and Clarice's clothes as they slide down. The Vaults contain a gallery of Cobweb's rogues including the wholesome, monogamous Perverso-Cobweb (an homage to Bizarro), Cobweb's arsenal of billy-clubs (actually a collection of bizarre dildos reminiscent of such super-hero gadgets as Batman's batarang or Hawkeye's trick arrows), samples of the debilitating substance chocolatite (a chocolate version of kryptonite), and the Nano-Bordello of Zontar (the bottle city of Kandor).

Bibliography
Tomorrow Stories #1 (August 1999) - #12 (February 2002)
Tomorrow Stories Special #1 (October 2005)
Tom Strong #36 (March 2006)

America's Best Comics superheroes
Comics characters introduced in 1999
Female characters in comics
Female superheroes
Fictional lesbians
LGBT superheroes
Characters created by Alan Moore